William Walter Becker (May 18, 1921 – April 2, 2007) was an American hotelier. He is best known for creating the Motel 6 concept of inexpensive motel rooms.

Born in Pasadena, California, he was working as a house painter in Santa Barbara, California when he took a trip in 1960. The price and quality of the motel rooms were substandard, and he contacted a building contractor friend named Paul Green about building low-cost hotels. The first Motel 6 opened in Santa Barbara in 1962 and offered rooms for $6. They sold the chain of 180 motels in 1968 for $14 million.

He then bought a cattle ranch in 1970 and in 1980 started the Stockmen's Bank, which was purchased in 2007 by National Bank of Arizona.

Becker died of a heart attack at his ranch outside Kingman, Arizona.

References

1921 births
2007 deaths
American bankers
American hoteliers
Ranchers from Arizona
Businesspeople from Arizona
People from Pasadena, California
People from Kingman, Arizona
20th-century American businesspeople